The Broome County Forum Theatre, also known as the Forum, Capri Theatre, and the Broome Center for the Performing Arts, is a historic theater, which is located at Binghamton in Broome County, New York. The theater seats 1,522 with a pit orchestra and 1,553 without one.

The building consists of two parts: the main, rectangular theater block completed in 1919 and the primary entrance and lobby area constructed in 1981 (non-contributing).  The theater block is constructed of brick and cast stone over a concrete basement.  It features a theater pipe organ.

The Forum serves as the home performing venue for the Binghamton Philharmonic and the Tri-Cities Opera.

The theatre was listed on the National Register of Historic Places in 2008.

References

External links

The Forum Theatre | Broome County, NY website

Buildings and structures in Binghamton, New York
History of Broome County, New York
National Register of Historic Places in Broome County, New York
Theatres on the National Register of Historic Places in New York (state)
Performing arts centers in New York (state)
Residential buildings completed in 1919
Tourist attractions in Binghamton, New York